Livingstone Airfield (34 mile) was an airfield at what is now Livingstone, Northern Territory, Australia during World War II.

The airfield was built by the 808th Engineer Aviation Battalion, less Company A and HQ Detachment, between 16 March 1942 until 13 April 1942. The airfield was named after Lieutenant Livingstone of 9th Fighter Squadron of the 49th Fighter Group who was killed as result of friendly fire when he was hit by Australian anti-aircraft guns during a Japanese air raid near Cox Peninsula to the west of Darwin, Northern Territory on 4 April 1942.

Units based at Livingstone Airfield
9th Fighter Squadron of 49th Fighter Group, Fifth Air Force, United States Army Air Forces
No. 14 Repair & Salvage Unit RAAF
No. 54 Squadron RAF
No. 77 Squadron RAAF (Kittyhawk)
No. 457 Squadron RAAF (Spitfire)
No. 548 Squadron RAF
102nd Coastal Artillery Battalion (AA Separate), US Army
161st Light Anti-aircraft Battery, Australian Army
 H Company, 135th US Medical Regiment, US Army
Security Guard Unit RAAF

Japanese bombing raids on Livingstone Airfield
 26 September 1942 (05:22 am)

See also
 List of airports in the Northern Territory

References
Pacific War Wrecks Database
OzatWarWebsite

External links

Lt. Col Bernard L. Robinson Reports on the NT June 1942

Airfields of the United States Army Air Forces
Former Royal Australian Air Force bases
World War II airfields in Australia
Defunct airports in the Northern Territory
Airports established in 1942
1942 establishments in Australia